The Byng Formation is a geologic formation in British Columbia. It preserves fossils dating back to the Ediacaran period.

See also

 List of fossiliferous stratigraphic units in British Columbia

References

 

Ediacaran British Columbia